Alexandru Bratan (born 23 August 1977) is a male weightlifter from Moldova. He twice competed for his native country at the Summer Olympics: 2000 and 2004. He is best known for winning the silver medal in the men's heavyweight division (– 105 kg) at the 2005 World Weightlifting Championships. His brother is Eugen Bratan.

In 2006 the International Weightlifting Federation (IWF) banned Alexandru Bratan for life, for the second doping violation.

References

External links
 

1977 births
Living people
Moldovan male weightlifters
Weightlifters at the 2000 Summer Olympics
Weightlifters at the 2004 Summer Olympics
Olympic weightlifters of Moldova
Doping cases in weightlifting
Moldovan sportspeople in doping cases
Sportspeople banned for life
European Weightlifting Championships medalists
World Weightlifting Championships medalists
20th-century Moldovan people
21st-century Moldovan people